Avantasia is a German supergroup metal opera project created by Tobias Sammet, vocalist of the band Edguy. It has been characterized as a rock opera, as it features the contributions of various vocalists and musicians and it consists of concept albums.

Conceived in 1999 as studio-only, two-album project, Avantasia has since released seven other studio albums and has toured the world multiple times. It can be divided into four periods of activity. The first, 1999–2002, saw the release of a self-titled single and the full-length albums The Metal Opera and The Metal Opera Part II. The second, 2006–2011, consists of the EPs Lost in Space Part I & II and The Wicked Trilogy, composed of the albums The Scarecrow, The Wicked Symphony and Angel of Babylon. The third, 2013–2016, includes the albums The Mystery of Time and Ghostlights. The fourth period, 2019–2022, comprises the albums Moonglow and A Paranormal Evening with the Moonflower Society.

Some of the guest vocalists and musicians that have been featured on Avantasia are Michael Kiske, Jørn Lande, Alice Cooper, Klaus Meine, Dee Snider, Hansi Kürsch, Jon Oliva, Biff Byford, Joe Lynn Turner, Tim "Ripper" Owens, Geoff Tate, Kai Hansen, Rudolf Schenker, Bruce Kulick, Sascha Paeth, Eric Singer, Bob Catley, Roy Khan, Russell Allen, Timo Tolkki, Rob Rock, David DeFeis, Andre Matos, Sharon den Adel, Floor Jansen, Ralf Scheepers, Marko Hietala, Arjen Anthony Lucassen, Henjo Richter, Markus Grosskopf, Jens Johansson, Eric Martin, Ronnie Atkins, Oliver Hartmann, Mille Petrozza, Candice Night and Amanda Somerville.

History

The Metal Operas (1999–2002)
In Spring 1999, during  Edguy's 'Theater of Salvation' tour, Tobias Sammet began to outline his ideas for a metal opera concept album featuring a number of guest musicians. When the tour finished, he began collaborating with metal vocalists like Michael Kiske, Andre Matos, Kai Hansen, Rob Rock, David Defeis, Sharon den Adel, Bob Catley and Oliver Hartmann to record the project. At this stage the core band consisted of four members, Sammet on keyboards, Henjo Richter on guitar, Markus Grosskopf on bass and Alex Holzwarth on drums. In 2001, a self-titled single and the first full-length album, The Metal Opera, were released. The project went on hiatus after the release of The Metal Opera Part II in September 2002.

The Wicked Trilogy (2006–2011)
At the end of 2006, Sammet confirmed the rumours of a third Avantasia album, due for release in 2008. Two EPs named Lost in Space Part I and Part II were released on 19 November 2007, while the full-length album, The Scarecrow, was released on 25 January 2008. The Scarecrow marked the first chapter of "The Wicked Trilogy" concept and was also the first of many Avantasia releases to feature Sascha Paeth on the role of main guitarist and producer. The album included guest performances by drummer Eric Singer, guitarists Henjo Richter and Rudolf Schenker and singers Jørn Lande, Michael Kiske, Bob Catley, Alice Cooper, Roy Khan, Amanda Somerville and Oliver Hartmann.

After the release of The Scarecrow, Tobias Sammet was invited to perform a headlining show at Wacken Open Air, an offer that producer/guitarist Sascha Paeth convinced him to accept. That led to 13 shows between 5 July and 13 August. The shows at Masters of Rock and Wacken Open Air were recorded and the live DVD The Flying Opera, based on the footage, was released in March 2011. The line-up for the short tour consisted of Tobias Sammet, Andre Matos, Jørn Lande, Kai Hansen, Bob Catley, Amanda Somerville, Cloudy Yang, Sascha Paeth, Oliver Hartmann, Robert Hunecke, Miro and Felix Bohnke (Edguy).

In November 2009, Sammet announced that he was recording two new albums, The Wicked Symphony and Angel of Babylon, to be released on 3 April 2010. The concept of the albums was a continuation of The Scarecrow story and these three albums together are often referred to as "The Wicked Trilogy". The special guests included drummers Eric Singer, Alex Holzwarth and Felix Bohnke, guitarists Bruce Kulick and Oliver Hartmann, keyboardist Jens Johansson and vocalists Jørn Lande, Russell Allen, Michael Kiske, Bob Catley, Klaus Meine, Tim "Ripper" Owens, Jon Oliva, Andre Matos, Cloudy Yang and Ralf Zdiarstek. The Scarecrow, The Wicked Symphony and Angel of Babylon have scored high positions in various international music charts.

A 12 show tour of Europe, South America and Asia took place during December 2010, with the exception of one concert at the Wacken Open Air festival in August 2011. The concerts lasted for almost three hours and many of them were sold out days before. The ensemble was almost the same as on The Scarecrow Tour in 2008, with two changes. Andre Matos was replaced by ex-Helloween and current Unisonic singer Michael Kiske (with Kai Hansen also participating on this tour, there were a lot of instances when the two ex-Helloween members shared the same stage) and the fact that Cloudy Yang was not part of the line-up.

Both tours were closely documented by Amanda Somerville on her YouTube channel. The videos show various interesting backstage moments such as rehearsals, cancelled flights, or the ensemble travelling by a regular train.

The Ghostlights saga (2012–2017)

In August 2012, Sammet announced that "I didn‘t foresee how much I need Avantasia when I decided to finish this chapter of my life in 2011. After the worldwide success of the latest studio releases, an arena world tour that was sold out pretty much everywhere, collaborations with childhood heroes...I 'knew' that I had said everything I could possibly say in the name of Avantasia. But that's not what Avantasia is all about. I wanna create more great music, I wanna create more fantasy-worlds, the bigger and the more epic, the better. And listening to the material that I have created for this forthcoming chapter in the history of Avantasia, I know there is no way I am not going to do it! I have got the feeling and the certainty, that this is absolutely meant to happen and to be."

During December 2012 it was revealed on Sammet's Avantasia website that the new album would be called The Mystery of Time and was due for release on 30 March 2013. The Mystery of Time marked the beginning of a new concept and was the first Avantasia release to feature the German Film Orchestra Babelsberg. The album included guest performances by drummer Russell Gilbrook, guitarists Bruce Kulick, Oliver Hartmann and Arjen Anthony Lucassen, while the guest vocalists were Joe Lynn Turner, Biff Byford, Michael Kiske, Ronnie Atkins, Eric Martin, Bob Catley and Cloudy Yang. The Mystery Of Time scored high positions in several international music charts and even enabled the project to enter the US Billboard charts for the very first time.

Avantasia's second biggest world tour took place between April and August 2013. The tour consisted of 30 concerts and included 7 headlining festival appearances in Europe, one festival performance in Canada and three hour long shows in South America, Japan, Russia, Germany, Switzerland, Italy and Holland. The line-up for the tour consisted of vocalists Tobias Sammet, Michael Kiske, Ronnie Atkins, Eric Martin, Bob Catley, Thomas Rettke, Amanda Somerville and musicians Sascha Paeth, Oliver Hartmann, Miro, Andre Neygenfind and Felix Bohnke.

According to Sammet: "I wanna put on the biggest thing you have ever seen, I wanna bring more vocalists, play longer shows, and just make it a giant Rock Opera. I love to headline festivals, you run over people in 90 minutes and kick ass. But I also like to do our own Avantasia indoor tour because we can make it much more Avantasia oriented and play almost three hours...It will be huge."

With two shows remaining at the end of the tour, Sammet held a press conference in which he announced that Avantasia would perform a headline performance at Wacken Open Air Festival in 2014. He also indicated that this would be a farewell performance as no further Avantasia activities were planned for the near future:

In a May 2014 interview regarding Edguy's then latest release Space Police: Defenders of the Crown, Sammet said that The Mystery of Time hinted at a possible sequel. The new album, entitled Ghostlights, was released on 29 January 2016 and featured guest performances by guitarists Bruce Kulick and Oliver Hartmann, while the guest vocalists were Jørn Lande, Michael Kiske, Dee Snider, Geoff Tate, Marko Hietala, Ronnie Atkins, Sharon den Adel, Bob Catley, Robert Mason and Herbie Langhans. Ghostlights scored the highest positions of any Avantasia release in several international music charts and even enabled Avantasia to enter the US Billboard charts for the second time.

The "biggest world tour so far" took place between March and August 2016. According to Avantasia's website it consisted of approximately 40 concerts in Europe, North America, South America, Canada, Japan, Russia and Scandinavia. With the exclusion of 8 headlining European summer festival performances, each concert lasted for over three hours. The ensemble was almost the same as on the previous tour with the addition of Jørn Lande and Herbie Langhans. As he did after announcing the 2014 Wacken performance, Sammet once again suggested that the Ghostlights World Tour might be the project's last activity in a long time:

After the completion of the tour, Avantasia headlined both Wacken Open Air and Barcelona Rockfest during the summer of  2017.

The Moonglow saga (2018–present)
In March 2018, Sammet posted a picture on his Facebook announcing he had begun the creative process regarding the eighth Avantasia album.

On 10 October Nuclear Blast officially announced the new album Moonglow would be released on 15 February 2019, and would feature guest vocals by Jørn Lande, Geoff Tate, Ronnie Atkins, Hansi Kürsch, Bob Catley, Michael Kiske, Candice Night, Eric Martin and Mille Petrozza. Subsequently, the album was accompanied by the Moonglow World Tour 2019 consisting of 29 concerts across Europe, Australia, and the United States and South America taking place between March and June 2019.

In March 2020, Tobias posted that he is about to start working on a successor album to Moonglow. The writing of the new album was in progress throughout 2020 and 2021. The album was released on 21 October 2022 under the title A Paranormal Evening with the Moonflower Society and featured guest vocals by Floor Jansen, Jørn Lande, Michael Kiske, Ralf Scheepers, Bob Catley, Geoff Tate, Eric Martin and Ronnie Atkins.

Discography

Studio albums
 The Metal Opera (2001)
 The Metal Opera Part II (2002)
 The Scarecrow (2008)
 The Wicked Symphony (2010)
 Angel of Babylon (2010)
 The Mystery of Time (2013)
 Ghostlights (2016)
 Moonglow (2019)
 A Paranormal Evening with the Moonflower Society (2022)

Members

Current core members
 Tobias Sammet – lead vocals, bass guitar, keyboards (2001–present)
 Sascha Paeth – guitars, producer (2007–present)
 Miro – keyboards, orchestration (2007–present)
 Felix Bohnke – drums (2010, 2015–present)

Former core members
 Markus Grosskopf – bass guitar (2001–2002)
 Henjo Richter – guitars (2001–2002, 2007–2010)
 Alex Holzwarth – drums (2001–2002, 2010)
 Eric Singer – drums (2002, 2007–2010), vocals (2007)
 Russell Gilbrook – drums (2013)

Vocalists

Musicians

References

External links

Tobias Sammet's official (Avantasia) website
official Avantasia & Edguy Fanclub website

German musical groups
German symphonic metal musical groups
German power metal musical groups
German progressive metal musical groups
Concept album series
Heavy metal supergroups
Musical quartets
Musical groups established in 1999
Nuclear Blast artists
1999 establishments in Germany